Bruno Barticciotto Di Bartolo (born 7 May 2001) is a Chilean professional footballer who plays as a forward for Chilean club Palestino, on loan from Universidad Católica.

Club career
Barticciotto made his debut on March 28, 2021, scoring his first goal against Antofagasta in a 4–2 defeat. After being loaned at Palestino in 2021, he returned to the club on second half 2022 until the end of the season.

International career
He represented Chile U20 in a friendly tournament played in Teresópolis (Brazil) called Granja Comary International Tournament, making an appearance in the second match against Bolivia U20.

He represented Chile at under-23 level in a 1–0 win against Peru U23 on 31 August 2022, in the context of preparations for the 2023 Pan American Games.

Personal life
He is the son of Marcelo Barticciotto, an Argentine-born Chilean historical player of Colo-Colo.

Career statistics

Club

Honours 
Universidad Católica
Primera División: 2020

References

External links
 

2001 births
Living people
People from Santiago Province, Chile
Footballers from Santiago
Chilean people of Argentine descent
Chilean people of Italian descent
Sportspeople of Argentine descent
Chilean footballers
Chile under-20 international footballers
Association football forwards
Chilean Primera División players
Club Deportivo Universidad Católica footballers
Club Deportivo Palestino footballers